The Long Buttes are a low mountain range of  buttes in the western Mojave Desert, in Los Angeles County, California.

References 

Mountain ranges of the Mojave Desert
Mountain ranges of Los Angeles County, California
Buttes of California